Carnot's theorem  (named after Lazare Carnot) describes a necessary and sufficient condition for three lines that are perpendicular to the (extended) sides of a triangle having a common point of intersection. The theorem can also be thought of as a generalization of the Pythagorean theorem.

Theorem 
For a triangle  with sides  consider three lines that are perpendicular to the triangle sides and intersect in a common point . If   are the pedal points of those three perpendiculars on the sides ,  then the following equation holds:

The converse of the statement above is true as well, that is if the equation holds for the pedal points of three perpendiculars on the three triangle sides then they intersect in a common point. Therefore, the equation provides a necessary and sufficient condition.

Special cases 
The equation of Carnot's Theorem then yields the Pythagorean theorem .

Another corollary is the property of perpendicular bisectors of a triangle to intersect in a common point.

References

External links 
 Florian Modler: Vergessene Sätze am Dreieck - Der Satz von Carnot at matheplanet.com (German)
 Carnot's theorem at cut-the-knot.org

Theorems about triangles